Ramey may refer to:

Ramey Air Force Base, a former base in Aguadilla, Puerto Rico
Ramey, Pennsylvania
Ramey, Puerto Rico, a US sub-orbital launch site
Ramey House, an historic mansion in Tyler, Texas, USA

People
 Ramey Dawoud, Sudanese American Rapper, actor

Surname
Claude Ramey (1754–1838), French sculptor, father of Etienne-Jules Ramey
Estelle Ramey (1917–2006) American scientist
Étienne-Jules Ramey (1796–1852), French sculptor
Harry R. Ramey, Jr., US politician
Horace Ramey (1885–1974), American athlete
Howard Knox Ramey (1896–1943), American general
James Ramey (1944–1970): see Baby Huey (singer)
James Ramey (1917-2015), American politician
James T. Ramey (1914–2010), American lawyer
Jim Ramey (born 1957), American football player
Phillip Ramey (born 1939), American composer
Samuel Ramey (born 1942), American singer
Valerie Ramey, American economist
Venus Ramey (1924–2017), Miss America, 1944
Roger M. Ramey, American general of the Eighth Air Force who was involved with the Roswell UFO incident